The Beijing–Taipei high-speed rail corridor (also known as Beijing–Fuzhou high-speed railway due to the political status of Taiwan), is a partly completed high-speed railway corridor, intended to connect Beijing in China and Taipei, in Taiwan.

Route 
The line shares tracks with the following railway lines:
Beijing–Shanghai high-speed railway between Beijing and Bengbu
Hefei–Bengbu high-speed railway between Bengbu and Hefei
Hefei–Fuzhou high-speed railway between Hefei and Fuzhou
Fuzhou–Pingtan railway, between Fuzhou and Pingtan
Pingtan–Hsinchu high-speed railway, between Pingtan and Hsinchu
Thereafter, it would cross an undersea tunnel which has been proposed by the Chinese government, which would connect Pingtan and Hsinchu. It would share tracks with the Taiwan High Speed Rail from Hsinchu to Taipei. 

Project planning is unilateral, undertaken without the participation of Taiwan, which the People's Republic of China claims, but has never controlled. The Pingtan–Taipei portion of the railway headed to Taiwan is referred as "possible long-term future expansions" in construction documents of Fuzhou–Pingtan section.

Parallel corridors 
The Chinese government has planned the Beijing–Hong Kong (Taipei) corridor as a parallel railway corridor. The corridor will pass through the cities of Hengshui, Shangqiu, Hefei and Fuzhou.

Reception 
The plan, along with the Taiwan Strait Tunnel Project, has been widely mocked in Taiwan.

See also 
 Taiwan Strait Tunnel Project

References 

High-speed rail in China
High-speed rail in Taiwan